WBUC is an Adult Standards formatted broadcast radio station licensed to Buckhannon, West Virginia, serving Buckhannon and Upshur County in West Virginia.  WBUC is owned and operated by AJG Corporation.

References

External links

1959 establishments in West Virginia
Adult standards radio stations in the United States
Radio stations established in 1959
BUC